Wittman v. Personhuballah, 578 U.S. ___ (2016), was a United States Supreme Court case in which the Court held that the appellants lacked standing under Article III of the United States Constitution to pursue their appeal. The case dealt with redistricting by the Virginia Legislature of Virginia's 3rd congressional district and allegations of gerrymandering based upon race. The appeal was brought by Congressmen David Brat, Randy Forbes, and Rob Wittman.

References

External links
 

Congressional districts of Virginia
United States Supreme Court cases
United States Supreme Court cases of the Roberts Court
2016 in United States case law
Legal history of Virginia
United States electoral redistricting case law